Hanalei is a census-designated place (CDP) in Kauai County, Hawaii, United States. The population was estimated at 299 as of 2019. Hanalei means "lei making" in Hawaiian. Alternatively, the name Hanalei also means "crescent bay" and may be indicative of the shape of Hanalei Bay. Hanalei can also be translated as lei valley, referring to the rainbows that color the valley and encircle Hanalei like a wreath.

Geography 
Hanalei is located at  (22.206653, -159.500713), near the mouth of the Hanalei River on the north shore of the island of Kauai. It is bordered to the east by Princeville.

The total area is 8.17% water.

History 
Hanalei was well-populated in ancient times with a thriving native population that produced a bountiful supply of food from land to sea. Hanalei's earliest residents grew large amounts of taro, bananas, breadfruit, sweet potato, yams, and coconuts. As foreigners started discovering Hawai'i and taking up residence in the islands, they brought in new agricultural ventures. During the first half of the 1800s Hanalei was supplying bountiful resources of mulberry leaves, coffee, tobacco, cotton, rice, sugarcane, citrus fruits, peaches, pineapples, bananas, dates, tamarinds, guava, potatoes, plantains, cabbage, lettuce and other products.

Hawaiian Royalty 
Hanalei was visited by many members of the Royal Hawaiian family in the 1800s. King Kamehameha II took a 42-day voyage to Kauai in 1821. King Kamehameha III visited Hanalei in 1852. King Kamehameha IV visited Hanalei in 1856 with Queen Emma, and visited again with their young son Prince Albert. Their visit later inspired Hanalei plantation owner R.C Wyllie to name his growing estate Princeville.

Princess Ruth came to Hanalei in 1867 with her two poodles and picnicked on the Hanalei River. King Kalakaua also visited Hanalei Bay in 1874, and was greeted with a 21-gun salute fired from improvised cannons built from the Ohia Lehua trees.

Imperial Russia 
In the early 19th century Russians were present here. In 1815 the German physician and agent of the Russian-American Company, Georg Anton Schäffer, came to the Hawaiian islands to retrieve goods seized by Kaumualiʻi, chief of Kauai island. On arrival he became involved with internal Hawaiian politics, and Kaumualiʻi planning and manipulating to reclaim his own kingdom of Kauai from Kamehameha I with the help of the Russian Empire. Kaumualiʻi signed a "treaty" granting Tsar Alexander I protectorate over Kauai. Briefly in 1817, Fort Elizabeth, near the Waimea River, and two other Russian forts near Hanalei were part of the tsarist Russian America.

1900s 
In the early 1900s, nearly every square inch of Hanalei's coastal plain was covered with rice fields. The first rice farmers were Chinese, followed by the Japanese, Filipinos, Portuguese and other ethnic groups, many of whom were former sugarcane workers who had finished their contracts with plantations. The rice farmers built homes, schools, stores, rice mills, churches or temples, and raised their families in Hanalei. Many descendants of the farmers and plantation workers still reside in Hanalei today.

Demographics 

At the 2000 census, there were 478 people, 193 households and 115 families residing in the CDP. The racial makeup of the CDP was 57% White, 18% Asian, 3% Pacific Islander, <1% from other races, and 21% from two or more races. Hispanic or Latino of any race were 4.81% of the population.

There were 193 households, of which 25% had children under the age of 18 living with them, 40% were married couples living together, 10% had a female householder with no husband present, and 40% were non-families. 31% of all households were made up of individuals, and 6.2% had someone living alone who was 65 years of age or older.  The average household size was 2.48 and the average family size was 3.10.

24% of the population were under the age of 18, 7% from 18 to 24, 27% from 25 to 44, 30% from 45 to 64, and 12% who were 65 years of age or older. The median age was 40 years. For every 100 females, there were 99.2 males. For every 100 females age 18 and over, there were 102.8 males.

The median household income was $34,375, and the median family income was $55,750. Males had a median income of $31,500 versus $28,500 for females. The per capita income for the CDP was $21,241. About 22% of families and 25% of the population were below the poverty line, including 33% of those under the age of 18 and none of those 65 and older.

Popular culture

Hanalei was the backdrop of several film productions, such as the 1958 musical film South Pacific. Scenes were filmed in the town itself and at Lumahai Beach to the west of Hanalei.

A spurious interpretation of the Peter Paul & Mary song "Puff, the Magic Dragon" as a marijuana metaphor claims that Puff's homeland "Hanah Lee" is actually the town of Hanalei, which, according to the interpretation, is renowned for its marijuana. The cliffs on the side of the beach are said to look like a dragon. This interpretation was rejected by the song's authors.

The beach at Hanalei Bay was selected No. 1 on "Dr. Beach" Stephen Leatherman's 2009 list of top 10 beaches.

Hanalei was mentioned in the TV series Twin Peaks as a place of residence for the town psychiatrist and his wife.

Scenes for the movie The Descendants starring George Clooney were filmed in and around Hanalei, on the beach at Hanalei Bay and in nearby Princeville.

A song titled "Hanalei" was a part of the I'm with You Sessions by the Red Hot Chili Peppers in 2013.

Education
Hanalei is served by the Hawaii Department of Education.  Hanalei Elementary School is located in the community, and is a public K-6 school. They have around 250 students. Middle school and high school are located in Kapa'a for all youth that reside on the North Shore of Kauai. Kapa'a middle school is for 6th-8th grade, and Kapa'a high school is for 9th-12th grade.

References

Census-designated places in Kauai County, Hawaii
Populated places on Kauai
Populated coastal places in Hawaii